Åre River (Swedish: Åreälven) is a river in Sweden.

References

Rivers of Jämtland County